In fluid dynamics, Darwin drift refers to the phenomenon that a fluid parcel is permanently displaced after the passage of a body through a fluid – the fluid being at rest far away from the body.

Consider a plane of fluid parcels perpendicular to the direction of the body's constant velocity vector, far before the passage of the body. During the passage of the body the fluid parcels move, according to their Lagrangian motion. Far after the passage of the body, the fluid parcels are permanently displaced. The volume between the initial plane of the fluid parcels and the surface consisting of the parcel positions long after the body's passage is called the Darwin drift volume.

The phenomenon is named after Sir Charles Galton Darwin, who proved in 1953 that the drift volume multiplied with the fluid density equals the added mass of the body, – known as Darwin's theorem.

As shown by Eames and McIntyre in 1999, Darwin drift (by the passage of a body through a fluid otherwise at rest) and Stokes drift (in the fluid motion associated with surface waves) are closely related.

Notes

References
 
 
 
 
 
 
 

 

Fluid dynamics